Llandudno Football Club is a Welsh football club that currently play in the Cymru North. They currently play their games at Nantporth Stadium in Bangor due to pitch issues their at home ground Maesdu Park.

History
Football in Llandudno dates back to 1878 when the club was originally known as Gloddaeth Rovers for around a decade. Gloddaeth Rovers were then replaced by Llandudno Swifts as the towns' main club. Following the demise of Swifts in 1901, a new club, Llandudno Amateurs were formed.

The club was formed for the purpose of providing activity for cricketers during their close season. A full international, Wales v Ireland, was played on the "council field" in 1898. Llandudno were founder members of the Welsh National League (North) in 1921 and were champions in 1923 and League Cup winners in 1930. The club won the North Wales Combination FA Cup in 1926 and the North Wales Amateur Cup in 1929. Controversy struck the club in 1931 when the FAW instructed them to play in East Wales, which Llandudno refused and were suspended.

Llandudno were founder members of the Welsh League North in 1935 and remained in the league until war broke out in 1939 and then rejoined in 1945 and stayed until 1974. Llandudno were league champions in 1936 and repeated the feat the following season. In addition the club won the North Wales Amateur Cup in 1948 and 1962, the Alves Cup in 1951 and the Cookson Cup in 1965.

The club was re-formed and renamed Llandudno Football Club in 1988.

The club moved to its current home at Maesdu Park in 1991 after the "council field" was used for the construction of an ASDA store in the late 1970s, now the new Parc Llandudno. The current ground was officially opened in 1991 and floodlights were added in 1994. The following season saw the erection of a clubhouse and two small stands which provide covered seating for 130 spectators. The club has since undergone major transitions, with the addition of a press box. In the 2004–05 season new dressing rooms were completed. New grandstands, with disabled access, are in place and the stadium meets the criteria set down for Cymru Premier football.

In August 2014, Wales national football team manager Chris Coleman visited Maesdu Park to officially open Llandudno's new £420,000 3G pitch.

After a successful 2014–15 Cymru Alliance season, Llandudno were promoted as champions to the Welsh Premier League for the first time in their history.

In July 2015, Llandudno FC entered into a significant strategic partnership with local organisation, MBi Consulting Ltd. As such the club was known as MBi Llandudno Football Club and Maesdu Park was renamed as Park MBi Maesdu. Llandudno enjoyed a remarkable first season in the Welsh Premier League which saw them finish 3rd and earn them a place in the Europa League for the first time in their history in 2016–17.

The club were relegated back to the second tier in the 2018–19 season and play in the Cymru North.

On 20 May 2021, it was announced that Llandudno, alongside Scottish Championship side Ayr United, League of Ireland First Division side Cobh Ramblers and NIFL Premiership side Portadown, had entered into a partnership with Premier League club Burnley, which was dubbed the 'British Isles Club Partnerships' by Burnley. As a result of the partnership, Llandudno, and the other affiliated clubs, will benefit from a range of support from Burnley, having access to the club's football, operational and commercial expertise as well as access to coaching education and player access.

European record

Notes
 1Q: First qualifying round

Honours
Welsh League (North):
Champions: 1935–36, 1936–37
North Wales Combination FA Cup:
Winners: 1925–26
Welsh National League (North):
Champions: 1922–23
Welsh National League (North) Cup:
Winners: 1929–30
North Wales Amateur Cup:
Winners: 1928–29, 1947–48, 1961–62
Alves Cup:
Winners: 1950–51
Cookson Cup:
Winners: 1964–65
Cymru Alliance:
Winners: 2014–15

Current squad

Non-playing staff

First-team

References

External links
 Llandudno F.C.'s official website
 Gwyn Hughes' website includes this club.

Football clubs in Wales
Sport in Conwy County Borough
Association football clubs established in 1988
Llandudno
1988 establishments in Wales
Cymru Premier clubs
Cymru Alliance clubs
Cymru North clubs
Welsh Alliance League clubs
Welsh National League (North) clubs
Welsh League North clubs
North Wales Coast League clubs